Cappadocia was a Hellenistic-era Iranian kingdom centered in the historical region of Cappadocia in Asia Minor (present-day Turkey). It developed from the former Achaemenid satrapy of Cappadocia, and it was founded by its last satrap, Ariarathes (later Ariarathes I). Throughout its history, it was ruled by three families in succession; the House of Ariarathes (331–96 BC), the House of Ariobarzanes (96–36 BC), and lastly that of Archelaus (36 BC–17 AD). In 17 AD, following the death of Archelaus, during the reign of Roman emperor Tiberius (14–37 AD), the kingdom was incorporated as a Roman province.

Origins and history

Under the Achaemenids, the "Iranization" of Asia Minor had been significant, and a large Iranian presence had been established in western Asia Minor, Pontus and Cappadocia. Ariarathes had been satrap of Cappadocia for 19 years and a loyal supporter of the Achaemenid kings. By blood, he was related to the ruling Achaemenid house ("Cyrus and Darius’ Seven") as well as other satraps. When Alexander of Macedon invaded Cappadocia as part of his conquest of the Persian Empire, he appointed two temporary governors. For the Iranians in Asia Minor, "as perhaps everywhere", the fall of the Achaemenids "meant crisis". With the victory of Alexander and the emergence of Hellenistic successor kings, the Iranians in Caria and "probably throughout western Asia Minor" eventually started to adapt themselves to the changing situation. The Iranian presence to the west of the Halys River thus slowly started to fade. However, to east of the Halys River, things went differently. The Cappadocians had shown opposition to the invading Macedonians "from the beginning". After the defense of Halicarnassus, the Cappadocians participated in the Battle of Gaugamela (331 BCE) against Alexander, and even after the battle, they "rose up in his rear".

Unlike the Iranians in Caria and "probably throughout western Asia Minor", the Iranian aristocracy to the east of the Halys River, in Cappadocia and Pontus, declared independence, "in defiance of the Macedonians". Ariarathes I managed to assume power in Cappadocia, becoming the first king of the newly established Kingdom of Cappadocia. Ariarathes's line would provide the first ten kings of the kingdom. After a period of Seleucid overlordship, the Cappadocian Kingdom gained its independence during the reign of Ariarathes III ( 255-220 BC). The Ariarathid dynasty was abolished by the early course of the 1st century BC by the ruler of the Kingdom of Pontus, the infamous Mithridates VI (Eupator), this in an attempt to fully subdue the Cappadocian Kingdom. However, in "conflict" with the interests of the Roman Republic, the Romans supported the Cappadocians to choose a new king; this came to be another Iranian nobleman, namely Ariobarzanes I. After the civil war in Rome, the Romans started to interfere more directly in Cappadocian affairs; in 36 BC, Marcus Antonius appointed Archelaus, a local noble, to the Cappadocian throne. When, at an old age, Tiberius summoned him to Rome, he died there of natural causes; Cappadocia was subsequently incorporated as a fully functioning Roman province. Due to the kingdom's perilous location amongst powerful neighbors, the kings were often involved in beneficial marriage alliances, such as with the Mithridatic dynasty as well as the Seleucid dynasty.

Strabo, who wrote during the time of Augustus (r. 63 BCE-14 AD), almost three hundred years after the fall of the Achaemenid Persian Empire, records only traces of Persians in western Asia Minor; however, he considered Cappadocia "almost a living part of Persia".

Religion
Following the Macedonian conquests, the Persian colonists in Cappadocia as well as elsewhere were cut off from their co-religionists in Iran proper. Strabo, who observed them in the Cappadocian Kingdom in the first century BCE, records (XV.3.15) that these "fire kindlers" possessed many "holy places of the Persian Gods", as well as fire temples. The kingdom's domains possessed numerous sanctuaries and temples of various Iranian gods and deities, as well as Iranized deities. On their significant importance, numerous sanctuaries and deities of this category were noted by Strabo. Some of these are Anahita at Castabala, the magus Sagarios at Ariaramneia, and Ahura Mazda at Arebsum. In enclosures, known as Pyraitheia, there was worship in the name of the Zoroastrian religion. Regarding these Pyraitheia, he furthermore relates that "... in their midst there is an altar, on which there is a large quantity of ashes and where the magi keep the fire ever burning."

Administration
Initially, the kingdom was organized in ten satrapies. Later, this became eleven. The satrapies were called by the Greek term strategiai, and each of them were headed by the strategos, basically an important noble. The eleven satrapies were; Melitene, Cataonia, Cilicia, Tyanitis, Garsauritis, Laouiansene, Sargarausene, Saraouene, Chamanene, Morimene, and Cilicia Tracheia. Cilicia Tracheia, the eleventh and last satrapy, was added later to the kingdom.

Control over the lands of the kingdom was maintained through royal estates and fortifications protected and maintained by nobility. There were two types of estates: those located and centered on the residence of the noble in question (whose power, as the Encyclopedia Iranica adds, "was foremost temporal") and the so-called temple estates. Within these so-called temple estates, the priests had both temporal power as well as a religious function. As a result of the double role the clergy played, they were the highest in power after the king himself.

Hellenization
In imitation of their larger, western neighbors, the Seleucids and Attalids, the Cappadocian kings Hellenized various aspects of the kingdom on purpose. Both the members of the Ariarathid as well as that of the Ariobarzanid houses would receive a Greek education, and adopted Hellenic titles, such as basileus, instead of the native shah. Although the first few Cappadocian kings, that is, of the Ariarathid family, minted Iranian-style coins with Aramaic descriptions, from king Ariarathes III and on, they shifted to using Greek-style coins and inscriptions. During the reign of Ariamnes, the first coins appeared with Greek inscriptions, with the monarch depicted on it in Persian dress. Like the Seleucids, the Cappadocian kings named newly founded cities after themselves (e.g., Ariaramneia, Ariarathei, Archelais). Furthermore, all three royal houses were "honored" by the Greek poleis. Roughly speaking, Hellenization in the kingdom started slowly from the course of the 3rd century BCE, and quickened in the 2nd. Nevertheless, until the end of the kingdom, all its rulers bore Iranian names.

Capital
According to Strabo, the capital Mazaca was well-developed and had a large population. It was surrounded by numerous villages and plantations; all of these, in turn, were well protected by fortifications controlled by members of the royal family and the nobility.

Kings of Cappadocia

 Ariarathes I 331–322 BC
 Ariarathes II 301–280 BC
 Ariaramnes 280–230 BC
 Ariarathes III 255–220 BC
 Ariarathes IV 220–163 BC
 Ariarathes V 163–130 BC
 Ariarathes VI 130–116 BC
 Ariarathes VII 116–101 BC
 Ariarathes VIII 101–96 BC
 Ariarathes IX 100–85 BC
 Ariobarzanes I 96–63 BC
 Ariobarzanes II 63–51 BC
 Ariobarzanes III 51–42 BC
 Ariarathes X 42–36 BC
 Archelaus 36 BCE–17 AD

See also
 Cappadocian calendar

References

Sources
 
 
 
 
 
 
 
 

 
Classical Anatolia
4th-century BC establishments
States and territories established in the 4th century BC
320s BC establishments
Achaemenid Empire
States and territories disestablished in the 1st century
History of Nevşehir Province
History of Kayseri Province
History of Kırşehir Province
History of Aksaray Province
History of Niğde Province
Roman client kingdoms
Iranian dynasties
Zoroastrianism
Former kingdoms